Olav Magnusson (1099 – 22 December 1115) was king of Norway in 1103–1115. He was the son of King Magnus Barefoot and Sigrid, daughter of Saxe of Vik.

Olav became king together with his half-brothers Sigurd Jorsalfar and Øystein Magnusson when his father Magnus Barefoot died in 1103. He was king of Norway for twelve years, but unlike his brothers he did not leave a lasting impression on the nation. Since he was still very young, his older brothers acted as regents for his part of the kingdom. In 1107, King Sigurd was to lead a Norwegian crusade in support of the newly established crusader Kingdom of Jerusalem, returning to Norway in 1111.  During this period, King Øystein served as regent for his brother, using his energy and willpower to create a strong and stable country.

In 1115, Olav fell ill and died when he was only 17 years old.  He was succeeded by his co-ruler brothers. He was counted as "Olav III" until 1957 (when Olav V became king, who otherwise would have been VI), and counting him was dropped from the official Norwegian list of monarchs.

References

1099 births
1115 deaths
12th-century Norwegian monarchs
House of Hardrada
Monarchs who died as children
Medieval child monarchs
Burials at Nidaros Cathedral